Luke Johnson (born 18 March 1994) is a British professional tennis player.

Johnson achieved his career-high Association of Tennis Professionals (ATP) singles ranking of world No. 606 in November 2021 and doubles ranking of world No. 160 in February 2023.

Johnson made his ATP Tour and Grand Slam main draw debut simultaneously at the 2019 Wimbledon Championships after receiving a wildcard for direct entry into the doubles draw. Partnering compatriot Evan Hoyt, the pair were defeated in the first round by Nicholas Monroe and Mischa Zverev in straight sets 4–6, 4–6, 5–7.

Luke has reached 41 career doubles finals, 40 coming on the ITF Futures tour. He has a record of 21 wins and 20 losses. He has yet to reach a tournament finals in singles play.

Personal
Johnson grew up in the Leeds suburb of Roundhay and attended The Grammar School at Leeds. He played cricket up until the age of 16 but then decided to focus exclusively on tennis. 

He moved to the United States for his higher education and played tennis for Clemson University.

ATP Challenger and ITF Futures finals

Doubles: 42 (22–20)

References

External links

1994 births
Living people
British male tennis players
Sportspeople from Leeds
Universiade medalists in tennis
Universiade silver medalists for Great Britain
Tennis people from West Yorkshire
Medalists at the 2017 Summer Universiade
20th-century British people
21st-century British people
People educated at the Grammar School at Leeds
English male tennis players